Imma flammula is a moth in the family Immidae. It was described by Alexey Diakonoff in 1978. It is found in Nepal.

The wingspan is 13–16 mm. The forewings are dark fuscous, very gradually becoming darker towards the costa. The costa has a triangular spot just before the middle, gently rounded, the base slightly extended anterad along the costal edge, pale yellow, dusted with orange. There is a larger, pale yellow inverted-cardiform transverse patch below and slightly beyond this. The tip and base suffused with orange, the tip rather pointed, reaching two-thirds across the disc, the base with a slender premedian notch. The basal part of the wing has five brightly orange spots and there is a longitudinal streak along the basal fifth, from beyond the base, half-way between the costa and the fold. Another, more slender streak is found along the fold and the second fifth of the wing length. An oval spot is found beyond and slightly below the upper streak and there is a round spot obliquely below the second streak, above the dorsum. An outwards-curved, broader obliquely transverse streak runs from the fold beyond the base to one-fourth of the dorsum. The terminal part of the wing has a strongly curved transverse series of some ten horizontal orange, almost interconnected marks, more or less slenderly pointed anteriorly, irregularly suffused posteriorly. A paler orange oval longitudinal spot is found before and adjacent to this row above its middle. The hindwings are lighter fuscous with a ferruginous tinge and a pale yellow discal spot.

References

Moths described in 1978
Immidae
Moths of Asia